Freestyle skiing at the 2011 Canada Winter Games was held at the Ski Wentworth in Cobequid Mountains, Nova Scotia. 

The events will be held during the first week between February 13 and 17, 2011.

Medal table
The following is the medal table for alpine skiing at the 2011 Canada Winter Games.

Men's events

The Aerials event is a best of two jumps (the total is not added together)

Women's events

The Aerials event is a best of two jumps (the total is not added together)

References

2011 in freestyle skiing
2011 Canada Winter Games